Ardfinnan Castle, is the sister castle of Lismore Castle and was built circa 1185 to guard the river crossing at Ardfinnan (Ard Fhíonáin in Irish) in County Tipperary, Ireland.  It is situated on the River Suir, seven miles west of Clonmel.  The castle is currently privately owned and is not open for public viewing.

The Anglo-Norman castle is positioned on a large rocky incline and it looks out over the Suir valley with the Knockmealdown Mountains to the south, and the Galtee Mountains to the northwest.  The castle is a parallelogram in shape with square battlements at the corners and a fortified entrance gateway.

Early history 
The castle was built circa 1185 on the order of John of England, then Lord of Ireland, during his first expedition to Ireland.  To guard the northern border of Waterford, John's father Henry II of England proposed Ardfinnan and Tybroughney on the river Suir, with Lismore on the Blackwater as key positions to erect castles.  Most importantly, Ardfinnan would secure a passage from the Anglo-Norman-occupied southern sea-board into central Ireland.  John arrived in Waterford in April 1185, after which he soon granted the Cambro-Norman knight Maurice de Prendergast with the Manor of Ardfinnan, in which he was tasked with the construction of Ardfinnan Castle and to defend it as its governor.   

In opposition to John's construction of the castles, Lismore Castle was taken by surprise in an attack by the Irish, and its governor, Robert de Barry, was slain along with his entire garrison.  King of Munster Donal O'Brien, King of Connacht Rory O'Conner and King of Desmond Dermod MacCarthy, now headed for Ardfinnan.  Opposite the imposing castle and on the other side of the river, it became aware to O'Brien that he would not be able to take it by force.  Indicating retreat, he turned back only to be pursued by the small garrison of knights holding Ardfinnan Castle, which for O'Brien would play the advantage.  He swiftly turned back towards Ardfinnan and surrounded the now exposed knights, slaying a large portion of them and subsequently taking Ardfinnan Castle.  After this and further successive defeats against the Irish Kings, John's original force of 300 men was decimated, and by December of that same year, 1185, he was summoned back to England by his father.   

The castle was promptly retaken and would continue to regularly change hands between the vying Anglo-Normans, until it was handed over to the Knights Templar, and later granted to the Knights Hospitaller.  While the Hospitallers protected this important pass between Cashel and Lismore, they constructed the castle's surviving circular keep in the early 13th century.

Cromwellian siege 
On Saturday 2 February 1650 major general Henry Ireton, who was accompanying Oliver Cromwell in his conquest of Ireland, had neither the boats or sufficient weather in order to make a crossing of the river Suir with his army and subsequently headed for the bridge at Ardfinnan to gain another crucial pass over the river Suir, second to the pass at Carrick.  In view of taking hold of the strategically placed castle which guarded this crossing from high above, he waited until around four o’clock the next morning to attempt a siege. Defending the castle from the Parliamentarians with a small force of soldiers was David Fitzgibbon (the White Knight), Governor of Ardfinnan Castle for Charles II.  With cannons placed on a hill opposite the castle, Ireton bombarded its once impenetrable walls until there was a large breakthrough after about 8 shots and then proceeded to kill about thirteen of the out-guard and lost only two of his men with about ten wounded.  After this the castle was promptly surrendered to the New Model Army who would use it as a garrison throughout their time in Ireland.  Fitzgibbon was spared his life for his swift surrender of the castle, but subsequently lost his lands at Ardfinnan and was transplanted to Connacht in 1653.  Guns, ammunition and other supplies arriving at Youghal would be brought over the river Blackwater at the pass at Cappoquin and then finally over the river Suir at Ardfinnan to reach the rest of the army in Tipperary.  With the end of the Cromwellian campaign of Ireland, the leaving Parliamentarian troops slighted Ardfinnan castle which partially left it in ruins.

British Army garrison 
In 1795 with the threat of invasion during the French Revolutionary Wars, the castle was once again occupied as a military garrison, with British Army fencible units.  Despite being in ruins, the position of the castle still commanded over a chief pass on the river Suir and it would be used along with the rest of the Ardfinnan and Neddans area to hold a British Army summer training camp, with reserves ready against French invasion.  Training in firing and marching were essential in forging these militia into an effective military force.  Although initially established as a temporary encampment for the summer months, it became a permanent camp in March 1796 by the orders of John Pratt, 1st Marquess Camden, which amounted a force of 2,740 mainly Protestant soldiers.  The camp was disbanded by 1802.

Restoration 
In the early 19th century, 15 acres with Ardfinnan Castle were reinstated to the descendants of Maurice de Prendergast, who were now descended of the Prendergasts' of Newcastle.  The castle's tower-house received a Victorian restoration around 1846, with the addition of adjoining buildings and was essentially turned into a country house. 

The last male member of this family to occupy the castle was Royal Navy Admiral, Sir Robert Prendergast, who settled in Eastbourne following his retirement in 1920. He was a suspected victim of the serial killer Dr. John Bodkin Adams when he died in 1946. 

From 1922 the castle was in the ownership of the Mulcahys' of the prosperous Ardfinnan Woollen Mills which the castle overshadows, on what was formerly the site of the Prendergast's flour mill.  Further restorations to the house were made by 1929.  The latest addition is the three-storey gable-ended wing, likely added during the 1930s.

References

External links
 Ardfinnan Castle at Ardfinnan.net (Archived)
 Painting of the Original Castle from Illustrated Dublin Journal, No. 6, 12 October 1861
 Photograph of Castle
 Information on Ardfinnan Community Council Website
 Article on the Castle
 Article from 1841 on the Castle
 1860 Photograph

Castles in County Tipperary
Tourist attractions in County Tipperary